Karnam Venkatachalam (1874–1934) was an Indian government official. He attained posting of Karnam at an early age. During British reign, he was the chief of village people in Thamaraikulam.

Early life 
He was born in 1874 in Thamaraikulam, Theni, in the Indian state of Tamil Nadu. He is the Grand son of Karnam Thillai Nayagam.  He is the only son to his father.

Religion 

He practiced Hinduism and Saivism.

Healer 

He specialized in all arts and he cured many people by using medication skills which include curing snake bites and other evil related issues in positive manner. He ate all his meals at his home.

History of Thamaraikulam 

The group of people who lived around Dharapuram moved from their place during the Muslim kings invasion. Refugees moved there and created a village. The residents belonged to 5 different castes namely, Karkarthar, Ambalathaar, Maravar, Pillaimar and Vaaniyar. Later, Aasari people arrived.

References 

People from Theni district
1874 births
1934 deaths
People from British India